State Road 156 (NM 156) is a  state highway in the US state of New Mexico. NM 156's western terminus is at U.S. Route 84 (US 84) in Santa Rosa, and the eastern terminus is at NM 252 south of Ragland.

Major intersections

See also

References

156
Transportation in Guadalupe County, New Mexico
Transportation in Quay County, New Mexico